Author Solutions is the parent company of the self publishing companies/imprints AuthorHouse, iUniverse, Trafford Publishing, Xlibris, Palibrio, and Booktango. Author Solutions also maintains partnerships with traditional book publishers Simon & Schuster (Archway Publishing), Thomas Nelson (WestBow Press), Hay House (Balboa Press),  and Guideposts (Inspiring Voices); as well as with Writer's Digest (Abbott Press).

Author Solutions is headquartered in Bloomington, Indiana.

Founded in 2007, Author Solutions reports publishing 190,000 titles written by 150,000 authors. In 2012, Pearson acquired Author Solutions from Bertram Capital Management for $116 million. It also offers a suite of "book-to-screen" services intended to provide authors with Hollywood access.

History 

Self-publishing has experienced rapid growth since 2006, with annual title output increasing 287 percent according to R.R. Bowker, the agency that issues ISBNs in the United States. In April 2008, Author Solutions Marketing Director Keith Ogorek said that 1 out of every 17 books published in the United States is from AuthorHouse.
In 2009, Author Solutions, acquired two other top competitors – Xlibris in January  and Canadian self-publisher Trafford Publishing in April. Later that year the company partnered with leading Christian publisher Thomas Nelson to launch a first-of-its-kind self-publishing partnership, WestBow Press.
Expansion to other segments of authors continued in June 2010 when Author Solutions launched its first Spanish-language imprint – Palibrio. Palibrio was initially offered only to the U.S. Spanish-speaking market, but later was made available to authors in Spain.

On May 3, 2013, Penguin announced that on July 1 Andrew Phillips would be assuming the position of Author Solutions CEO, replacing longtime CEO Kevin Weiss who was leaving to take another position.

On July 1, 2013, Author Solutions' parent company Penguin Group completed a merger with Random House to form Penguin Random House.

In 2013 Forbes magazine and Publishers Weekly reported that Author Solutions and its associated companies were being sued as part of a potential class action suit alleging deceptive practices. Damages of 5 million dollars were sought. Publishers Weekly reports that the suit has been filed in the Southern District of New York. In July, 2015, the court denied class action certification to the suit, and in August 2015 the lawsuit was "discontinued without prejudice" after a settlement was reached between the parties. A second case was dismissed in September.

On December 31, 2015 Author Solutions, LLC was sold to Najafi Companies after on-going talks.

Criticism 
Author Solutions is frequently criticized by author advocacy groups for predatory marketing practices, excessive fees, high-pressure sales, and poor customer service. These criticisms led to Author Solutions' inclusion in the Science Fiction and Fantasy Writers of America's Thumbs Down Publisher List, multiple Watchdog Advisories from the Alliance of Independent Authors, and alerts from Writer Beware.

Imprints and Divisions
 Archway Publishing
 Author Learning Center
 AuthorHouse
 AuthorHouse UK
 AuthorHive
 Balboa Press
 Balboa Press UK
 Booktango
 GABAL Global Editions
 iUniverse
 LifeRich Publishing
 megustaescribir
 Palibrio
 Partridge Publishing
 Partridge Africa
 Partridge India
 Partridge Singapore
 Trafford Publishing
 WestBow Press
 Wordclay
 Xlibris

References

External links
Author Solutions - official site.

Book publishing companies based in Indiana
Companies based in Bloomington, Indiana
American companies established in 2007